Laqueidae is a family of brachiopods belonging to the order Terebratulida.

Genera
Genera:
 Aldingia Thomson, 1916
 Colinella Owen, 1981
 Dalligas Steinich, 1968
 Eodallina Elliott, 1959
 Eudesia King, 1850
 Glaciarcula Elliott, 1956
 Kamoica Hatai, 1936
 Kikaithyris Yabe & Hatai, 1946
 Kurakithyris Hatai, 1946
 Langshanthyris Sun, 1987
 Laquethiris Bitner, 1996
 Laqueus Dall, 1870
 Lusitanina Andrade, 2006
 Pacifithyris Hatai, 1938
 Parakingena Sun, 1981
 Psilothyris Cooper, 1955
 Rossithyris Owen, 1980
 Tamarella Owen, 1965
 Terebrataliopsis
 Tetrabratalia Beecher, 1893
 Waldheimiathyris Helmcke, 1939

References

Terebratulida